Siguniangshan Town, formerly Rilong Town, is a town in Xiaojin County in the Ngawa Tibetan and Qiang Autonomous Prefecture of Sichuan, China. It is a main base for visiting Mount Siguniang. Rilong  lies at roughly 3,160 meters above sea level, and the population are mainly Tibetan.

Township-level divisions of Sichuan